Orchis is a genus in the orchid family (Orchidaceae), occurring mainly in Europe and Northwest Africa, and ranging as far as Tibet, Mongolia,  and Xinjiang. The name is from the Ancient Greek ὄρχις orchis, meaning "testicle", from the appearance of the paired subterranean tuberoids.

Description 
These terrestrial orchids have root tubers instead of pseudobulbs. They are extremely diverse in appearance. They produce an erect stem. They start flowering at the base, slowly progressing upwards, except for the Monkey orchid (Orchis simia), which flowers in reverse order.

The original genus Orchis used to contain more than 1,300 names. Since it was polyphyletic, it has been divided by Pridgeon et al., into several new genera (see Reference): Ponerorchis, Schizodium, Steveniella. They can be found in tropical Rainforest and semi-desert regions, near the seashore and in the tundra. The majority of neotropical orchid species can be found in southern Central America, northwest South America

Taxonomy

Species 
, the World Checklist of Selected Plant Families accepts 21 species, along with a number of subspecies:
 Orchis adenocheila Czerniak. (Iran)
 Orchis anatolica Boiss. – Anatolian orchid (Cyprus, Turkey, Southern Aegean Islands, Syria, Lebanon, Israel, Palestine, Iran)
 Orchis anthropophora (L.) All. (Western Europe to Mediterranean)
 Orchis brancifortii Biv. (Southern Italy, Sicilia, Sardinia)
 Orchis galilaea (Bornm. & M.Schulze) Schltr. (Turkey, Syria, Lebanon, Israel, Palestine)
 Orchis italica Poir. – Man orchid, Italian orchid (Mediterranean)
 Orchis mascula (L.) L. – Early purple orchid, (N. & C. Europe to Iran, Canary Islands)
 Orchis mascula subsp. ichnusae Corrias
 Orchis mascula subsp. laxifloriformis Rivas Goday & B.Rodr.
 Orchis mascula subsp. mascula
 Orchis mascula subsp. scopulorum (Summerh.) H.Sund. ex H.Kretzschmar, Eccarius & H.Dietr.
 Orchis mascula subsp. speciosa (Mutel) Hegi
 Orchis militaris L. – Military orchid (Europe to Mongolia)
 Orchis militaris subsp. militaris
 Orchis militaris subsp. stevenii (Rchb.f.) B.Baumann & al.
 Orchis olbiensis Reut. ex Gren. (NW. Italy - to NW. Africa)
 Orchis pallens L. – Pale-flowered orchid (Europe to Caucasus)
 Orchis patens Desf. (Central Mediterranean to NW. Africa)
 Orchis patens subsp. canariensis (Lindl.) Asch. & Graebn.
 Orchis patens subsp. patens
 Orchis pauciflora Ten. (Albania, Corsica, Greece, Italy, Crete and Yugoslavia)
 Orchis provincialis Balb. ex Lam. & DC. (SC. & S. Europe to Caucasus, NW Africa)
 Orchis punctulata Steven ex Lindl. – Small-dotted orchid (SE. Europe to W. Asia)
 Orchis purpurea Huds. – Lady orchid, purple orchid (Europe to Caucasus, Algeria) 
 Orchis purpurea subsp. caucasica (Regel) B.Baumann & al.
 Orchis purpurea subsp. purpurea
 Orchis quadripunctata Cirillo ex Ten. – Four-spotted orchid (Sardinia to Eastern Mediterranean)
 Orchis simia Lam. – Monkey orchid (Europe to Iran, N. Africa)
 Orchis simia subsp. simia
 Orchis simia subsp. taubertiana (B.Baumann & H.Baumann) Kreutz
 Orchis sitiaca (Renz) P.Delforge
 Orchis spitzelii Saut. ex W.D.J.Koch – Spitzel's orchid (Sweden (Gotland), E. Spain to Caucasus, NW. Africa)
 Orchis spitzelii subsp. cazorlensis (Lacaita) D.Rivera & Lopez Velez
 Orchis spitzelii subsp. nitidifolia (W.P.Teschner) Soó
 Orchis spitzelii subsp. spitzelii
 Orchis troodi (Renz) P.Delforge

Natural hybrids 
, the World Checklist of Selected Plant Families accepts 37 hybrid species, along with a number of hybrid subspecies:
 Orchis ×  algeriensis B.Baumann & H.Baumann (O. patens × O. spitzelii)
 Orchis × angusticruris Franch. (O. purpurea × O. simia) (Europe to Caucasus)
 Orchis × angusticruris nothosubsp. angusticruris (O. purpurea subsp. purpurea × O. simia)
 Orchis × angusticruris nothosubsp. transcaucasica B.Baumann & al. (O. purpurea subsp. caucasuca × O. simia)
 Orchis ×  apollinaris W.Rossi & al. (O. italica × O.  simia) (Italy)
 Orchis ×  aurunca W.Rossi & Minut. (O. pauciflora × O. provincialis)
 Orchis ×  bergonii Nanteuil (O. anthropophora × O.  simia) (Western Mediterranean)
 Orchis ×  beyrichii (Rchb.f.) A.Kern. (O. militaris × O.  simia) (Europe to Turkey)
 Orchis × beyrichii nothosubsp. beyrichii (O. militaris subsp. militaris × O. simia)
 Orchis × beyrichii nothosubsp. golestanica (Renz) H.Kretzschmar, Eccarius & H.Dietr. (O. militaris subsp. stevenii × O. simia)
 Orchis ×  bispurium (G.Keller) H.Kretzschmar, Eccarius & H.Dietr. (O. anthropophora × O. militaris × O. purpurea)
 Orchis ×  bivonae Tod. (O. anthropophora × O. italica)  (Southern Europe)
 Orchis ×  buelii Wildh. (O. provincialis × O. quadripunctata)
 Orchis ×  caesii De Angelis & Fumanti (O. italica × O. purpurea)
 Orchis ×  calliantha Renz & Taubenheim (O. punctulata × O. simia) (Turkey)
 Orchis ×  chabalensis B.Baumann & al. (O. militaris subsp. stevenii × O. punctulata)
 Orchis × colemanii Cortesi (O. mascula × O. pauciflora)
 Orchis ×  fallax (De Not.) Willk. (O. patens × O. provincialis)
 Orchis ×  fitzii Hautz. (O. anatolica × O. mascula) (Turkey)
 Orchis ×  hybrida (Lindl.) Boenn. ex Rchb. (O. militaris × O. purpurea) (Europe)
 Orchis ×  klopfensteiniae P.Delforge (O. pallens × O. spitzelii) (SW Europe)
 Orchis ×  kretzschmariorum B.Baumann & H.Baumann (O. anatolica × O. provincialis)
 Orchis ×  ligustica Ruppert (O. mascula × O. patens) (Mediterranean)
 Orchis ×  loreziana Brügger(O. mascula × O. pallens) (Europe)
 Orchis × loreziana nothosubsp. kisslingii (Beck) Potucek (O. mascula subsp. speciosa × O. pallens) (Eastern Europe)
 Orchis × loreziana nothosubsp. loreziana (O. mascula subsp. mascula × O. pallens) (Central Europe)
 Orchis ×  lucensis Antonetti & Bertolini (O. pauciflora × O. simia)
 Orchis ×  macra Lindl. (O. anthropophora × O. purpurea) (Europe)
 Orchis ×  orphanidesii (E.G.Camus) B.Bock (O. anthropophora × O. mascula)
 Orchis ×  palanchonii G.Foelsche & W.Foelsche (O. olbiensis × O. pauciflora)
 Orchis ×  penzigiana A.Camus (O. mascula × O. provincialis)
 Orchis × penzigiana nothosubsp. jailae (Soó) H.Kretzschmar, Eccarius & H.Dietr. (O. mascula subsp. speciosa × O. provincialis)
 Orchis × penzigiana nothosubsp. penzigiana (O. mascula subsp. mascula × O. provincialis)
 Orchis × penzigiana nothosubsp. sardoa Scrugli & M.P.Grasso (O. mascula subsp. ichnusae × O. provincialis)
 Orchis ×  permixta Soó (O. mascula subsp. signifera × O. pallens × O. provincialis) (Crimea) 
 Orchis ×  petterssonii G.Keller ex Pett. (O. mascula × O. spitzelii) (Europe, NW Africa)
 Orchis × petterssonii nothosubsp. incantata (P.Delforge) H.Kretzschmar, Eccarius & H.Dietr. (O. mascula subsp. laxifloriformis × O. spitzelii subsp. cazorlensis)
 Orchis × petterssonii nothosubsp. petterssonii (O. mascula subsp. mascula × O. spitzelii subsp. cazorlensis)
 Orchis ×  plessidiaca Renz (O. pallens × O. provincialis) (SE Europe to Krym)
 Orchis ×  pseudoanatolica H.Fleischm. (O. pauciflora × O. quadripunctata) (SE Europe)
 Orchis ×  schebestae Griebl (O. mascula × O. quadripunctata)
 Orchis ×  serraniana P.Delforge (O. mascula subsp. laxifloriformis × O. olbiensis)
 Orchis ×  sezikiana B.Baumann & H.Baumann (O. anatolica × O. quadripunctata)
 Orchis ×  spuria Rchb.f. (O. anthropophora × O. militaris) (Europe)
 Orchis ×  thriftiensis Renz (O. anatolica × O. pauciflora)
 Orchis ×  tochniana Kreutz & Scraton (O. italica × O. punctulata) (Cyprus)
 Orchis ×  willingiorum B.Baumann & H.Baumann (O. provincialis × O. spitzelii)
 Orchis ×  wulffiana Soó (O. punctulata × O. purpurea) (Crimea to caucasus)
 Orchis × wulffiana nothosubsp. suckowii (Kümpel) B.Baumann & al. (O. punctulata × O. purpurea subsp. caucasica)
 Orchis × wulffiana nothosubsp. wulffiana (O. punctulata × O. purpurea subsp. purpurea)

Intergeneric hybrids 
 Orchiophrys (Ophrys x Orchis)
 Orchiserapias (Orchis x Serapias)

See also 
 Salep
 List of taxa named after human genitals

References 

 (in German)

External links 
 
 
 Orchis picture database
 Orchis genera in Turkey

 
Orchideae genera

Taxa named by Joseph Pitton de Tournefort